The 2011 Colorado earthquake occurred on August 22 at  with a moment magnitude of 5.3 and a maximum Mercalli intensity of VII (Very Strong). It was the largest natural earthquake to affect Colorado for more than a hundred years.

The earthquake occurred as part of a swarm of smaller quakes that started the previous day. The last time the Colorado region received a series of earthquakes was in 2001, when about a dozen smaller-sized temblors were recorded. The shock occurred as a result of normal faulting and was similar in depth, style and location to the events that made up the 2001 swarm.

See also

List of earthquakes in 2011
List of earthquakes in the United States
2011 Virginia earthquake - Second M 5.0+ earthquake to hit the United States in less than a day, occurring almost 12 hours later.

References

Sources

External links
 Wastewater injection is culprit for most earthquakes in southern Colorado and northern New Mexico, study finds – Science Daily
Was the M5.3 Trinidad, CO Earthquake Natural or Induced? – United States Geological Survey

2011 earthquakes
Earthquakes in Colorado
2011 in Colorado
Las Animas County, Colorado
August 2011 events in the United States